The Second Berejiklian ministry was the 97th ministry of the Government of New South Wales, and was led by Gladys Berejiklian, the state's 45th Premier. It was the second and subsequent of two occasions that Berejiklian served as Premier.

The Liberal–National coalition ministry was formed following the 2019 state election where the Berejikilian government was re-elected. The ministry was sworn in by the Governor David Hurley on 2 April 2019. On 1 October 2021, Berejiklian announced that she would be resigning from the post as well as from the Parliament. She was replaced by treasurer Dominic Perrottet as Premier on 5 October 2021.

Composition of ministry

 
Ministers are members of the Legislative Assembly unless otherwise noted.

On 10 September 2020, the Nationals announced that they were moving to the crossbench over disagreements with the Liberal Party surrounding koala habitat protection legislation. However, the Nationals still maintained ministerial portfolios. The decision was reversed the following day.

See also

Gladys Berejiklian – 45th Premier of New South Wales
Members of the New South Wales Legislative Assembly, 2019–2023
Members of the New South Wales Legislative Council, 2019–2023

External links

Notes

References

New South Wales ministries
2019 establishments in Australia
2021 disestablishments in Australia
Ministries established in 2019
Ministries disestablished in 2021